The Benson & Hedges World Series Cup was a cricket tournament held in Australia from 27 November 1979 to 22 January 1980. It was a tri-nations series featuring Australia, England and the West Indies, with all of the matches being played as One Day Internationals (ODI). The series was part of the English and West Indian tour and was the first official tri-nations series after World Series Cricket.

After the round-robin matches which played at four venues in Adelaide, Brisbane, Melbourne and Sydney. England and the West Indies reached the final where the West Indies won the final series 2–0. The red ball was used and the white pads were worn for the matches in Adelaide, Brisbane and Melbourne, and the white ball was used and the coloured pads were worn for the matches in Sydney. England and West Indies would not contest the tri-series again until the 1986-87 season.

Points Table

Fixtures

1st Match

2nd Match

3rd Match

4th Match

5th Match

6th Match

7th Match

8th Match

9th Match

10th Match

11th Match

12th Match

Best of 3 finals series

1st Final

2nd Final

References

1979 in Australian cricket
1979 in English cricket
1979 in West Indian cricket
1979–80 Australian cricket season
1980 in Australian cricket
1980 in English cricket
1980 in West Indian cricket
1979
1979–80
International cricket competitions from 1975–76 to 1980
1979–80